Radio Slovakia International (RSI) is Slovakia's official internet-based international broadcaster. The station was created almost simultaneously with the emergence of independent Slovakia and began broadcasting on 4 January 1993.

Its duties were laid down as providing listeners in other countries with information about the new state and maintaining contact with the numerous expatriate Slovak communities around the world. Organizationally, it is a part of the state-owned nationwide public broadcasting organization Rozhlas a televízia Slovenska (Radio and Television Slovakia).

Programming
RSI's programmes are broadcast in English, German, French, Russian, Spanish, and, for expatriates, Slovak. Its daily 30-minute magazine programmes contain news from Slovakia, features on the Slovak economy, sciences, culture, geography, environment, sports, examples of the spoken, written, and musical arts, and portraits of important personalities.

Broadcasting
Radio Slovakia International broadcasts worldwide via internet and via the World Radio Network platform.

Frequencies

Shortwave transmissions
Radio Slovakia International stopped broadcasting on shortwave from Slovakia, but is now relayed on two WRMI frequencies (11580kHz & 5850kHz) and via Shortwave Service in Germany (6005kHz)

Former English-language schedule and frequencies
 01:00–01:30 to North America on 5930 kHz (summer) and 7230 kHz (winter), and to South America on 9440 kHz
 07:00–07:30 to Australasia on 9440 and 11650 kHz (summer), and 13715 and 15460 kHz (winter)
 16:30–17:00 to Western Europe on 5920 kHz (summer only)
 17:30–18:00 to Western Europe on 6055 kHz
 17:30–18:00 to Western Europe on 5915 kHz (winter only)
 18:30–19:00 to Western Europe on 5920 kHz (summer only) and 6055 kHz
 19:30–20:00 to Western Europe on 5915 kHz (winter only) and 7345 kHz

See also
 Rozhlas a televízia Slovenska (Radio and Television Slovakia), the Slovak publicly funded radio and television broadcaster
 List of international radio broadcasters

References

External links
 Radio Slovakia International official website 

Radio stations in Slovakia
International broadcasters
Radio stations established in 1993
1993 establishments in Slovakia
Radio and Television of Slovakia